The England cricket team toured India during February and March 2021 to play four Test matches, three One Day International (ODI) and five Twenty20 International (T20I) matches. The Tests formed part of the inaugural 2019–2021 ICC World Test Championship, and the ODI series formed part of the inaugural 2020–2023 ICC Cricket World Cup Super League. In December 2020, the full itinerary was released with three venues hosting the entire tour.

England won the first Test by 227 runs, and India won the second Test by 317 runs, to level the series at 1–1. The third Test, a day/night fixture, was completed inside two days, with India winning by ten wickets. The loss meant that England could no longer qualify for the final of the World Test Championship. India won the fourth and final Test by an innings and 25 runs, taking the series 3–1. The series win meant that India joined New Zealand in the final of the World Test Championship.

India won the fourth T20I match by eight runs, to level the series 2–2 with one match to play. India won the fifth and final T20I by 36 runs, to win the series 3–2. India won the first ODI by 66 runs, with England winning the second ODI by six wickets to level the series ahead of the final ODI of the tour. India won the third ODI by seven runs, winning the series 2–1.

Background
Originally, England were scheduled to tour India in September and October 2020 to play the ODI and T20I matches. However, after the 2020 ICC Men's T20 World Cup was postponed by one year due to the COVID-19 pandemic, the 2020 Indian Premier League (IPL) was rescheduled to be played in its place. In February 2020, the Board of Control for Cricket in India (BCCI) announced that they would like to play a day/night Test match at the refurbished Narendra Modi Stadium. The England and Wales Cricket Board (ECB) confirmed the changes to England's tour in August 2020.

On 20 August 2020, Sourav Ganguly, president of the BCCI, said that India would host England to fulfil their Future Tours Programme (FTP) commitments. In September 2020, the BCCI were also in discussions with the Emirates Cricket Board with regards to using the United Arab Emirates to host the series, due to the COVID-19 situation. Later the same month, Sourav Ganguly reiterated that it was a "priority" to host the matches in India, and that the BCCI were continuing to monitor the COVID-19 situation.

The tour's itinerary originally was scheduled to have five Tests, three ODIs and three T20I matches. However, in November 2020, Sourav Ganguly confirmed that one of the Test matches had been dropped with two more T20I matches added to the tour, in preparation for the 2021 ICC Men's T20 World Cup. On 1 January 2021, the Government of India announced that up to 50% of fans would be allowed in stadiums for sporting events, and it was expected that the BCCI would also allow fans in the stadiums for the series. Initially, the BCCI and the Tamil Nadu Cricket Association (TNCA) took the decision not to allow fans into the stadium for the first two Test matches. However, the decision was later reversed, with up to 50% of fans allowed to attend the second Test. On 27 January 2021, the England team arrived in Chennai to begin their quarantine ahead of the first Test.

The International Cricket Council (ICC) confirmed that Nitin Menon would be one of the on-field umpires for the first two Test matches. Anil Chaudhary and Virender Sharma were also named as on-field umpires for the first and second Tests respectively, with both of them making their debuts as Test cricket umpires. The same set of match officials were retained for the third and fourth Test matches.

Ahead of the first Test, Channel 4 secured the live broadcasting rights for the Test matches. The last time the channel screened live Test cricket in the United Kingdom was for the 2005 Ashes series. It was also the first full broadcast of an England overseas Test series on terrestrial television in the United Kingdom.

Crowds were allowed to attend the first two T20I matches, with more than 66,000 fans attending each of the two games. However, after a rise in COVID-19 cases in Ahmedabad, the BCCI and the Gujarat Cricket Association agreed to play the remaining T20I and ODI matches behind closed doors.

Squads

On 19 January 2021, the BCCI named India's squad for the first two Test matches. They also named K. S. Bharat, Abhimanyu Easwaran, Shahbaz Nadeem, Rahul Chahar and Priyank Panchal as standby players, and Ankit Rajpoot, Avesh Khan, Sandeep Warrier, Krishnappa Gowtham and Saurabh Kumar as net bowlers. Two days later, the ECB announced England's squad for the first two Test matches, with James Bracey, Mason Crane, Saqib Mahmood, Matt Parkinson, Ollie Robinson and Amar Virdi named as reserve players. Ollie Pope was not originally named in England's Test squad after sustaining an injury against Pakistan, but was added to the squad on 3 February 2021, after the England medical team were satisfied he had recovered sufficiently. The following day, Zak Crawley was ruled out of England's squad for the first two Tests with a wrist sprain. Ahead of the first Test, both Shahbaz Nadeem and Rahul Chahar were added to India's squad, after Axar Patel was ruled out of the match with a knee injury. England's Jos Buttler was rested for the last three Tests. Jofra Archer was ruled out of England's squad for the second Test due to an elbow injury. Ahead of the second Test, both Shahbaz Nadeem and Rahul Chahar were withdrawn from India's squad, returning to the reserves.

Following the conclusion of the second Test, Jonny Bairstow and Mark Wood were added to England's squad for the third Test. Moeen Ali returned home to England, therefore missing the last two Test matches. On 17 February 2021, the BCCI announced the squad for the last two Test matches, with Umesh Yadav joining the team and replacing Shardul Thakur. The BCCI also retained the same five net bowlers, K. S. Bharat and Rahul Chahar as standby players, and released Abhimanyu Easwaran, Shahbaz Nadeem and Priyank Panchal for the Vijay Hazare Trophy. England's Sam Curran was originally going to be available for the fourth Test, but was ruled out of the Test match due to the logistical challenges during the pandemic. Ahead of the fourth Test, Jasprit Bumrah and Chris Woakes were released from India's and England's squads respectively.

On 11 February 2021, England announced their T20I squad with Jake Ball and Matt Parkinson being named as reserves. Danny Briggs, Tom Helm and Will Jacks were also named as non-travelling reserves for England's limited-overs fixtures. Rahul Chahar was added to India's T20I squad, after being one of the standby players for the Test series. On 19 March 2021, India named their ODI squad, with Prasidh Krishna, Krunal Pandya and Suryakumar Yadav earning their maiden call-ups. Two days later, England confirmed their ODI squad, with Jofra Archer being ruled out due to an elbow injury. Jake Ball, Chris Jordan and Dawid Malan remained with the England squad as reserve players. Shreyas Iyer injured his shoulder in the first ODI match, and was ruled out of India's squad for the remaining two fixtures. Eoin Morgan was ruled out of final two ODIs, with Jos Buttler captaining England in Morgan's absence. Sam Billings was also ruled out of the second ODI with Dawid Malan added to England's squad.

Test series

1st Test

2nd Test

3rd Test

4th Test

T20I series

1st T20I

2nd T20I

3rd T20I

4th T20I

5th T20I

ODI series

1st ODI

2nd ODI

3rd ODI

Notes

References

External links
 Series home at ESPN Cricinfo

2021 in English cricket
2021 in Indian cricket
International cricket competitions in 2020–21
English cricket tours of India